The corticosteroid receptors are receptors for corticosteroids. They include the following two nuclear receptors:

 Glucocorticoid receptor (type I) – glucocorticoids like cortisol
 Mineralocorticoid receptor (type I) – mineralocorticoids like aldosterone

There are also membrane corticosteroid receptors, including the membrane glucocorticoid receptors and the membrane mineralocorticoid receptors, which are not well-characterized at present.

References

Intracellular receptors
Transcription factors